All Saints' Hampton is an Anglican church on The Avenue in Hampton in the London Borough of Richmond upon Thames. It was built in 1908 as part of the parish of St Mary's, Hampton and it has been a parish church since 1929. Its vicar is Rev. Donna Williams.

References

External links
Official website
A Church Near You: All Saints' Hampton

Hampton
Diocese of London
History of the London Borough of Richmond upon Thames